This is a list of Swedish coastal artillery regiments, battalions, corps and companies that have existed in the Swedish Navy.

By unit 

KA 1 Vaxholm Coastal Artillery Regiment (1902–2000)
KA 2 Karlskrona Coastal Artillery Regiment (1902–2000)
KA 3 Gotland Coastal Artillery Regiment (1937–2000)
KA 4 Älvsborg Coastal Artillery Regiment (1902–2000)
KA 5 Härnösand Coastal Artillery Regiment (1953–1998)

See also 

List of Swedish regiments

 
artillery